"Whispers in the Dark" is a song performed by British folk rock band Mumford & Sons, released as the third single from their second studio album Babel (2012). It was released on 11 March 2013 as a digital download. The song was written by Mumford & Sons and produced by Markus Dravs.

Music video
A music video to accompany the release of "Whispers in the Dark" was first released onto YouTube on 10 March 2013 at a total length of three minutes and nineteen seconds.

Track listing

Chart performance

Weekly charts

Year-end charts

Personnel
Marcus Mumford-Acoustic guitar, Vocals
Ted Dwane-Bass, vocals
Winston "Willie" Marshall-Banjo, vocals
Ben Lovett-Piano, vocals, Electric Guitar (live maybe recording)

Release history

References

2012 songs
2013 singles
Mumford & Sons songs
Island Records singles
Song recordings produced by Markus Dravs
Songs written by Marcus Mumford
Songs written by Ted Dwane
Songs written by Ben Lovett (British musician)
Songs written by Winston Marshall